Andrea Politti is an Argentine actress and TV host.

Awards
 2013 Martín Fierro Awards
 Best female TV host

References

Argentine actresses
Living people
Year of birth missing (living people)
Place of birth missing (living people)